Jerry Nelson Palacios Suazo (born November 1, 1981) is a Honduran football striker, who currently plays for Belmopan Bandits in Belize.

Club career
Palacios made his senior debut for Olimpia for whom he played 7 successive years except for a season at F.C. Motagua and a season at Vida.

He signed for Chinese Super League side Hangzhou Greentown in January 2010. He had a failed trial in South China in the Hong Kong First Division League.

After the Chinese season ended he returned to Marathón for the 2012 Clausura championship.
In July 2012 he joined Platense for the 2012 Apertura and in December 2012 he moved abroad again to play for Costa Rican side Alajuelense.

Palacios returned to Asia at the end of 2014, this time joining Malaysian club ATM FA. In January 2016 Palacios joined Real Sociedad.

In January 2019, Palacios joined Belmopan Bandits in Belize.

International career
Jerry Palacios made his debut for Honduras in a March 2002 friendly match against the USA and has, as of February 2013, earned a total of 13 caps, scoring 5 goals. He has represented his country in 4 FIFA World Cup qualification matches.

In the 2010 FIFA World Cup, held in South Africa, Honduras achieved an historical distinction by including Jerry, Johnny, and Wilson in their squad. They became the first trio of brothers to represent a single nation in the World Cup. He was included in the squad after the injury of Julio César de León.

International goals

Personal life
He is the brother of Milton, Wilson, Johnny and Edwin Palacios.
On October 30, 2007 Edwin, aged 14, was kidnapped in La Ceiba.  he was found dead one year and seven months later in Omoa.

References

 5.

External links

1981 births
Living people
People from La Ceiba
Association football forwards
Garifuna people
Honduran footballers
Honduras international footballers
2010 FIFA World Cup players
2014 FIFA World Cup players
2013 CONCACAF Gold Cup players
C.D. Olimpia players
F.C. Motagua players
C.D.S. Vida players
C.D. Marathón players
C.D. Real de Minas players
Zhejiang Professional F.C. players
Hunan Billows players
L.D. Alajuelense footballers
ATM FA players
C.D. Real Sociedad players
Expatriate footballers in China
Honduran expatriate sportspeople in China
Honduran expatriate sportspeople in Malaysia
Expatriate footballers in Costa Rica
Expatriate footballers in Malaysia
Honduran expatriate footballers
Chinese Super League players
China League One players
Liga Nacional de Fútbol Profesional de Honduras players
Liga FPD players
Malaysia Super League players